Pat Mason was an All-American Girls Professional Baseball League player.

According to All American League data, Pat Mason played in the league during the 1950 season. Additional information is incomplete because there are no records available at the time of the request.

In 1988 was inaugurated a permanent display at the Baseball Hall of Fame and Museum at Cooperstown, New York, that honors those who were part of the All-American Girls Professional Baseball League. Pat Mason, along with the rest of the girls and the league staff, is included at the display/exhibit.

Sources

All-American Girls Professional Baseball League players
Baseball players from Iowa
Sportspeople from Cedar Rapids, Iowa
Date of birth missing
Possibly living people
Year of birth missing